Leonardo "Leo" Leite (born March 23, 1978, in Rio de Janeiro, Brazil) is a retired Brazilian judoka, jiu jitsu practitioner, and mixed martial artist.

Martial arts career

Judo
Leite began his career in judo in 1984 at the Federal Club under Omar Brazil. In 1988, at age 10, he transferred to the Clube de Regatas do Flamengo and began to participate in official competitions of the Judo Federation of Rio de Janeiro and the Brazilian Judo Confederation. In 1997, he achieved a place in the Brazilian junior national team, and in 1998 the first call for leading the Brazilian judo team, which he continued until 2012. Leite also works as a TV commentator for Judo and MMA events.

Jiu Jitsu
Parallel to his judo career, in 1993 he began his career in jiu-jitsu under the supervision of Alexandre Paiva, who coaches him still today. In 1999, Leite competed in the World Jiu-Jitsu Championship, Jiu Jitsu's most important competition, for the first time. He was a brown belt then and was expecting to compete in that division. However, his coach Paiva had other plans for him, and two weeks before the event he promoted him to black belt. Leite won the competition, winning in the final against a legend in the sport, Mario Sperry.

MMA
In 2013, Leite started his MMA career. Competing in his native Brazil, he amassed a record of 4–0 in his first year in the sport.

In 2014, Leite began fighting for Legacy Fighting Championship in the United States. He won the Light Heavyweight and Middleweight titles while with the promotion.

In 2017, Leite entered Bellator MMA with an undefeated 10–0 record. In his first fight for the promotion, he faced Phil Davis on November 3, 2017 at Bellator 186. He lost the fight by unanimous decision.

In his second fight for the promotion, Leite faced Chris Honeycutt on July 13, 2018 at Bellator 202. He again lost the fight by unanimous decision.

After almost 4 years away due to a nearly fatal case of tuberculosis and a leg injury that required a long stay in the hospital, Leite returned for his farewell bout at LFA 132 on May 13, 2022 against Patrick Quadros. He won the bout via unanimous decision and retired from MMA.

Accomplishments

Judo
Brazilian Olympic Team - Pekin 2008 and London 2012
3x Pan American Champion
2x South American Champion
Three medals on the World Judo Championships Team competition
2x Second place on the Judo World Cup Championship
1x Third place on Judo World Cup Championship

Jiu Jitsu
8x Brazilian Champion
4x World Champion
2x World Cup Champion
South American Champion heavy weight and open weight
6x Second place on Jiu-Jitsu World Championship

Mixed martial arts record

|-
|Win
|align=center|11–2
|Patrick Quadros
|Decision (unanimous)
|LFA 132
|
|align=center|3
|align=center|5:00
|Rio de Janeiro, Brazil
|
|-
|Loss
|align=center| 10–2
|Chris Honeycutt
|Decision (unanimous)
|Bellator 202
|
|align=center|3
|align=center|5:00
|Thackerville, Oklahoma, United States
|
|-
|Loss
|align=center| 10–1
|Phil Davis
|Decision (unanimous)
|Bellator 186
|
|align=center|3
|align=center|5:00
|University Park, Pennsylvania, United States
|Light Heavyweight bout.
|-
|Win
|align=center| 10–0
|Moise Rimbon
|Decision (majority)
|Fight2Night 1
|
|align=center| 3
|align=center| 5:00
|Rio de Janeiro, Brazil
|
|-
|Win
|align=center| 9–0
|Julio Juarez
|Submission (rear-naked choke)
|Iron FC 10: POP
|
|align=center| 1
|align=center| 2:23
|Rio de Janeiro, Brazil
|Won the Iron FC Light Heavyweight Championship.
|-
|Win
|align=center| 8–0
|Matt Masterson
|TKO (punches)
|Final Fight Championship 25
|
|align=center| 3
|align=center| 1:13
|Springfield, Massachusetts, USA
|
|-
|Win
|align=center| 7–0
|Ryan Spann
|Decision (unanimous)
|Legacy Fighting Championship 48
|
|align=center| 5
|align=center| 5:00
|Lake Charles, Louisiana USA
|Defended the Legacy FC Middleweight Championship.
|-
|Win
|align=center| 6–0
|Larry Crowe
|TKO (knee & punches)
|Legacy Fighting Championship 39
|
|align=center| 2
|align=center| 2:19
|Houston, Texas USA
|Middleweight debut; won the Legacy FC Middleweight Championship.
|-
|Win
|align=center| 5–0
|Myron Dennis
|Submission (rear naked choke)
|Legacy Fighting Championship 35
|
|align=center| 4
|align=center| 4:50
|Tulsa, Oklahoma USA
|Won the Legacy FC Light Heavyweight Championship.
|-
|Win
|align=center| 4–0
|Elias Mendonca
|Submission (rear naked choke)
|BC: Bitetti Combat 20
|
|align=center| 1
|align=center| 1:07
|Rio de Janeiro, Brazil
|
|-
|Win
|align=center| 3–0
|Fabio Marongiu
|Decision (unanimous)
|WOCS: Watch Out Combat Show 31
|
|align=center| 3
|align=center| 5:00
|Rio de Janeiro, Brazil
|
|-
|Win
|align=center| 2–0
|Diosman Nery de Jesus
|Decision (unanimous)
|BC: Bitetti Combat 17
|
|align=center| 3
|align=center| 5:00
|Rio de Janeiro, Brazil
|
|-
|Win
|align=center| 1–0
|Alessandro Macedo
|Submission (rear naked choke)
|Fight Against Crack
|
|align=center| 1
|align=center| 3:25
|Rio de Janeiro, Brazil
|

References

Brazilian male mixed martial artists
Mixed martial artists utilizing judo
Mixed martial artists utilizing Brazilian jiu-jitsu
Brazilian practitioners of Brazilian jiu-jitsu
1978 births
Living people
Brazilian male judoka
South American Games gold medalists for Brazil
South American Games medalists in judo
Competitors at the 2010 South American Games
Sportspeople from Rio de Janeiro (city)